Ezhome Rice varieties Ezhome-1 and Ezhome–2 are the first high yielding, non-lodging organic red rice varieties. They are designed for the saline-prone Kaipad rice fields of Kerala. They yield awn-less, non-shattering grains, and favourable cooking qualities, better than local cultivars. The average yields of ‘Ezhome-1’ and ‘Ezhome-2’ are 3.5 tonnes/ha and 3.2 tonnes/ha respectively under close-planted and no-management conditions of Kaipad. This yield is 70% and 60% more than that of local cultivars. These varieties differ in duration, have distinct morphological and qualitative traits, and have different salinity tolerance mechanisms, imparting varietal diversity to the unique ecosystem of Kaipad.

These new seed varieties have been developed by the Kerala Agricultural University with the participation of farmers of Ezhome panchayat. This is the first venture of Kerala Agricultural University in development of a variety i) adopting the combined strategy of Global Breeding (traditional), and participatory plant breeding, and  ii) carrying out all stages of variety development directly in the problem area of farmers.

References

 Vanaja, T.,  Neema, V.P., Mammootty, K.P., Balakrishnan, P.C., Jayaprakash Naik, B. (2017). "A high yielding organic rice variety suited for coastal saline and non-saline fields: ‘Ezhome-2’". Journal of Organics, 4(1). 28 pages.
 

Rice
Agriculture in Kerala
Rice production in India
Rice varieties